Olesya Yuryevna Velichko (born May 20, 1981 in Taraz, Kazakhstan) is a modern pentathlete from Russia. She is a multiple-time medalist at the World Championships, and a double champion at the 2001 Junior World Championships.

Velichko competed at the 2004 Summer Olympics in Athens, Greece, where she finished seventeenth in the women's event, with a score of 5,016 points.

References

External links
  (archived page from Pentathlon.org)

1981 births
Living people
Russian female modern pentathletes
Olympic modern pentathletes of Russia
Modern pentathletes at the 2004 Summer Olympics
World Modern Pentathlon Championships medalists
21st-century Russian women